is a Japanese regional airline headquartered in Kōtō, Tokyo, Japan. It operates Japanese domestic services with its main base at Sendai Airport, Natori, Miyagi.

History
The airline was established on 29 January 1999 and started operations on 7 August 2000 between Sendai and Osaka's (Itami Airport) under the name of Fair Inc. It reached a co-operation agreement with All Nippon Airways under which it is provided assistance in capacities including flight operations, flight crew provision, maintenance and engineering services. The airline began service to Tokyo's Narita International Airport in April 2002. In October 2004 the Sendai-based airline changed its name to Ibex Airlines.

Destinations

Ibex Airlines operates services to the following scheduled destinations within Japan (as of November 2017):

Fleet

The Ibex Airlines fleet includes the following aircraft (as of August 2019):

Historical fleet
Ibex Airlines previously operated the following aircraft types:
 Bombardier CRJ100LR
 Bombardier CRJ200ER

References

External links

Official website

Regional airlines of Japan
Airlines established in 1999
Airline companies based in Tokyo
Japanese companies established in 1999